Stenophlebia is an extinct genus of dragon-damselfly from late Jurassic and early Cretaceous period.

Classification
This extinct genus includes the following nine described species:

S. amphitrite (Hagen, 1862) - Upper Jurassic, Germany (type species), 150 mya
S. corami Nel and Jarzembowski, 1996 - Lower Cretaceous, England, 145 mya
S. eichstaettensis Nel et al., 1993 - Upper Jurassic, Germany, 150 mya
S. karatavica Pritykina, 1968 - Upper Jurassic, Karabastau Formation, Kazakhstan, 160 mya
S. latreillei (Germar, 1839) - Upper Jurassic, Germany, 150 mya
S. liaoningensis Zheng et al., 2016 - Lower Cretaceous, China
S. lithographica (Giebel, 1857) - Upper Jurassic, Germany, 150 mya
S. phryne (Hagen, 1862) - Upper Jurassic, Germany, 150 mya
S. rolfhuggeri Bechly et al., 2003 - Upper Jurassic, Germany, 150 mya

References
Solnhofen Dragonfly Fossil

Dragonflies
Prehistoric Odonata genera
Late Jurassic insects
Cretaceous insects
Jurassic insects of Asia